Mae Margaret Whitman (born June 9, 1988) is an American actress and singer. She began acting in commercials as a child, making her film debut at the age of six in the romantic drama When a Man Loves a Woman (1994). She achieved recognition as a child actress for her supporting roles in One Fine Day (1996), Independence Day (1996), Hope Floats (1998), and her television role on JAG (1998–2001).

Whitman gained mainstream attention for her recurring role as Ann Veal on the Fox sitcom Arrested Development (2004–2006, 2013) and her role as Annie Marks on the NBC drama Good Girls. She also starred as Amber Holt in the NBC drama Parenthood (2010–2015), for which she received a nomination for the Critics' Choice Television Award for Best Supporting Actress in a Drama Series. She established herself as a prominent voice actor in children's film and television for her voice performances as Little Suzy in Johnny Bravo (1997–2004), Shanti in The Jungle Book 2 (2003), Katara in the Nickelodeon cartoon Avatar: The Last Airbender (2005–2008), Rose/Huntsgirl on American Dragon: Jake Long (2005–2007), Tinker Bell in eponymous films, Wonder Girl / Cassie Sandsmark in Young Justice (2012–2022), April O'Neil in the 2012 incarnation of Teenage Mutant Ninja Turtles, and Amity Blight in The Owl House (2020–present). She ventured into mature film roles with Scott Pilgrim vs. the World (2010) and The Perks of Being a Wallflower (2012), and made her leading role film debut in The DUFF (2015), for which she received critical praise and a Teen Choice Award nomination.

Early life
Whitman was born in Los Angeles, the only child of voice actress Pat Musick and personal manager and set construction coordinator Jeffrey Whitman. She attended Ribet Academy.

Career

Early roles
She started her career with a voice-over for a Tyson Chicken commercial at the age of two. Acting coach Andrew Magarian helped her memorize lines as she could not read. In 1994, at the age of six, Whitman made her film debut acting alongside Meg Ryan in When a Man Loves a Woman (1994), playing Ryan's youngest daughter, Casey Green. She beat 700 other girls who were interested in the part. In 1996, Whitman appeared in two films: Independence Day, playing Bill Pullman's daughter Patricia Whitmore, and One Fine Day, playing George Clooney's daughter Maggie Taylor. The same year, Whitman guest starred in the season three episode of Friends, "The One Where Rachel Quits". In 1998, she played Sandra Bullock's daughter, Bernice Pruitt, in Hope Floats. During several guest appearances from 1998 until 2001, Whitman played the role of Chloe Madison on JAG before starring in the Fox Family series State of Grace in which she portrayed Grace, a girl from a Catholic background who befriends Hannah (Alia Shawkat), a Jewish girl. She was also in 17 episodes of Chicago Hope.

2000s 

From 2004 to 2006, Whitman had a recurring role on Arrested Development. She also voiced Katara on Avatar: The Last Airbender from 2005 to 2008. Whitman appeared in the 2006 series Thief for FX Networks, playing the stepdaughter of Nick Atwater (Andre Braugher). Whitman made several high-profile guest appearances in 2006 and 2007. She also appeared on Desperate Housewives in the episode "Nice She Ain't" as Sarah, an unscrupulous friend of Julie Mayer (Andrea Bowen). Whitman also had a recurring role on Chicago Hope (1994–2000), playing the daughter of Dr. Kate Austin (Christine Lahti), in the series' later years.

Whitman was initially cast in the 2007 series remake of The Bionic Woman, playing the deaf younger sister of the title character. On June 27, 2007, TV Guide reported that Whitman was being replaced in the role of Jaime's sister and Lucy Hale was cast as Whitman's replacement the following July. An NBC spokesperson confirmed this, stating "The decision was purely creatively driven. It is very common to change storylines, characters, actors after the initial pilot is shot." The sister character's hearing was restored after this recasting at the request of an NBC executive.

She also appeared in the 2008 episode "Streetwise" of Law & Order: Special Victims Unit as an on-the-street-mother who adopts street children and testifies against her husband after her adopted daughter is murdered.  She appeared in the HBO series In Treatment as the supporting character Rosie.

Whitman voiced the character Tinker Bell in the Disney Tinker Bell films: Tinker Bell (2008), Tinker Bell and the Lost Treasure (2009) and Tinker Bell and the Great Fairy Rescue (2010) . As part of a deal to promote the production of the first Tinker Bell film, the UK's speaking clock started to use her voice at 0100GMT on October 26, 2008. Furthermore, she voiced the role as Rose in American Dragon: Jake Long, and played Cynder in The Legend of Spyro: The Eternal Night.

2010s 
In 2009, Whitman landed a regular role in NBC's version of the Ron Howard classic Parenthood, which premiered in 2010. She played Amber Holt, "a rebellious and willful teen whose only interest at present is her wannabe rock star boyfriend." Whitman played evil ex Roxy Richter in Edgar Wright's Scott Pilgrim vs. the World, a film adaptation of the Bryan Lee O'Malley indie comic series Scott Pilgrim, which also starred her former Arrested Development co-star Michael Cera in the title role. Whitman appeared on Family Guy in 2010. She had a large role in the 2012 film The Perks of Being a Wallflower opposite Logan Lerman, Emma Watson and Ezra Miller.

In 2013, she reprised her role as Ann Veal in Arrested Developments season four, six years after the series was canceled. She appeared alongside Darren Criss in three episodes of season three of Lisa Kudrow's Web Therapy, playing his girlfriend. In 2015, Whitman played the lead role in the comedy The DUFF. She also started filming Operator alongside Martin Starr in June. She voiced Batgirl in DC's Super Hero Girls series debuting on September 10, 2016. According to co-writer and director Roland Emmerich, Whitman did not reprise her role as the President's daughter in Independence Day: Resurgence, the sequel to the 1996 blockbuster hit Independence Day, because she did not want to read for the part.

Whitman has expressed her feelings on being typecast as an outsider in various roles in television and films. She has talked about being a child actor and her relatable experiences such as being bullied in high school for being "weird." In an interview with Bello Mag, Whitman explains that the entertainment industry constantly tells actors what they are "not" and felt her choosing of these roles was her "trying to communicate to everyone" who may go through similar situations, that it's okay to be who they are. One of Whitman's more notable quotes is, "People should recognize who you are and how you can act rather than how famous you are."

In 2018, Whitman was cast alongside Christina Hendricks and Retta on the NBC dramedy Good Girls. The show was renewed for a fourth season on May 15, 2020. In June 2021, the series was canceled after four seasons.

Music
Whitman has recorded "I Heard The Bells On Christmas Day" and "You Make Christmas Feel So Good" for School's Out! Christmas, and has sung guest vocals on a number of tracks from indie-punk band Fake Problems' 2010 album Real Ghosts Caught on Tape. Whitman has also been featured on her show Parenthood in the song "Gardenia" on the season two episode "The Booth Job" along with Landon Pigg. Whitman appears in the music videos for "I Was a Fool" and "Boyfriend" by Tegan and Sara. She performed a small speaking part in the rapper DVS' track "Charlie Chaplin" where she plays the part of what DVS sees as the stereotypical hipster expressing distaste with music and television to appear special.

Personal life 
Whitman came out as pansexual via Twitter on August 16, 2021, saying she knows she can "fall in love with people of all genders".

Filmography

Film

Television

Video games

Audiobooks

Awards and nominations

References

External links

 
 

1988 births
Living people
Actresses from Los Angeles
American child actresses
American film actresses
American television actresses
American video game actresses
American voice actresses
20th-century American actresses
21st-century American actresses
Pansexual actresses
LGBT people from California
American LGBT actors
20th-century American LGBT people
21st-century American LGBT people